Cape Verde has begun vaccinations against COVID-19.

Background

Vaccines on order 
Cape Verde is in negotiations with vaccine manufacturers. It intends to receive 267,293 vaccine doses through the COVAX pillar.

History

Timeline

March 2021 
Cape Verde is in negotiations with vaccine manufacturers. Courtesy of COVAX it received 24,000 doses of the Oxford–AstraZeneca COVID-19 vaccine on 12 March and 5,850 doses of the Pfizer–BioNTech COVID-19 vaccine on 14 March. Vaccinations commenced on 19 March. By the end of the month 3,699 vaccine doses had been administered.

April 2021 
By 19 April, 8,330 persons had been inoculated, most of whom with the Oxford–AstraZeneca vaccine. By the end of the month 15,780 vaccine doses had been administered.

May 2021 
21,318 vaccine doses had been administered by 12 May. By the end of the month 27,276 vaccine doses had been administered.

June 2021 
By the end of the month 86,434 vaccine doses had been administered.

July 2021 
By the end of the month 173,183 vaccine doses had been administered.

August 2021 
By the end of the month 296,476 vaccine doses had been administered.

September 2021 
By the end of the month 414,300 vaccine doses had been administered.

October 2021 
By the end of the month 504,434 vaccine doses had been administered. 94% of the targeted population had been fully vaccinated.

November 2021 
By the end of the month 544,075 vaccine doses had been administered. By mid-November, the entire targeted population had been fully vaccinated.

December 2021 
By the end of the month 571,130 vaccine doses had been administered. The entire targeted population was fully vaccinated.

January 2022 
By the end of the month 611,615 vaccine doses had been administered. The entire targeted population was fully vaccinated.

February 2022 
By the end of the month 704,843 vaccine doses had been administered. The entire targeted population was fully vaccinated.

March 2022 
By the end of the month 728,077 vaccine doses had been administered. The entire targeted population was fully vaccinated.

April 2022 
By the end of the month 752,194 vaccine doses had been administered. The entire targeted population was fully vaccinated.

Progress 
Cumulative vaccinations

References 

Cape Verde
Vaccination
Cape Verde